Gnorismoneura elegantica is a moth of the family Tortricidae. It is found in Vietnam.

The wingspan is 16 mm. The ground colour of the forewings is brownish cinnamon along the costa and at the base, but blackish grey to beyond the middle and then much paler, greyish scaled cream. There are a few black dots along the termen beneath the apex. The hindwings are brownish.

Etymology
The specific epithet refers to colouration of the forewing and is derived from Latin elegans (meaning elegant).

References

Moths described in 2008
Archipini
Moths of Asia
Taxa named by Józef Razowski